Virgilijus  is a Lithuanian masculine given name and may refer to:

Virgilijus Alekna (b. 1972),  Lithuanian discus thrower 
Virgilijus Vladislovas Bulovas (born 1939), Lithuanian engineer and politician
Virgilijus Noreika (born 1935),  Lithuanian tenor
Virgilijus Juozas Čepaitis (b. 1937),  Lithuanian publisher and translator
Virgilijus Kačinskas (born 1959),  Lithuanian politician

Lithuanian masculine given names